The year 1773 in architecture involved some significant events.

Events
 July 30 – Following the discovery of the iron waters in the civil parish of Fraião, archbishop D. Gaspar de Bragança orders the municipal council to proceed with the use of the waters. The municipal government contracts master mason Paulo Vidal (a resident of Adaúfe) to construct a fountain for 80$000 réis."for the people with better hygiene, comfort and seclusion to serve from the said water".
 Caspar Frederik Harsdorff is commissioned to redesign the Hercules Pavilion at Rosenborg Palace, Copenhagen, Denmark.  His design with niches and statues gives the building its current name.
 Domenico Merlini becomes the Royal Architect in Poland.

Buildings and structures

Buildings completed
 Pulteney Bridge in Bath, England, designed by Robert Adam.
 St. Hedwig's Cathedral, Berlin, Germany.

Births
 August 30 – Mihály Pollack, Hungarian Neoclassical architect (died 1855)

Deaths
 March 1 – Luigi Vanvitelli, Italian engineer and architect (born 1700)

References

Architecture
Years in architecture
18th-century architecture